Happy Together is the third studio album by the American rock band The Turtles. It was released in April 1967 on White Whale Records.

Track listing

Side one
"Makin' My Mind Up" (Jack Dalton, Gary Montgomery) – 2:16
"Guide for the Married Man" (John Williams, Leslie Bricusse) – 2:44
"Think I'll Run Away" (Howard Kaylan, Mark Volman) – 2:31
"The Walking Song" (Kaylan, Al Nichol) – 2:44
"Me About You" (Garry Bonner, Alan Gordon) – 2:32
"Happy Together" (Bonner, Gordon) – 2:56

Side two
"She'd Rather Be with Me" (Bonner, Gordon) – 2:21
"Too Young to Be One" (Eric Eisner) – 2:00
"Person Without a Care" (Nichol) – 2:25
"Like the Seasons" (Warren Zevon) – 1:56
"Rugs of Woods and Flowers" (Kaylan, Nichol) – 3:05

Bonus tracks from the now-defunct Axis Records (a former subsidiary of EMI; later re-issued on Rhino Records) CD re-issue:
"So Goes Love" (Gerry Goffin, Carole King) – 2:38 (inserted into the album's running order)

Bonus tracks from the Sundazed CD re-issue:
"She's My Girl" (Bonner, Gordon) – 2:37
"You Know What I Mean" (Bonner, Gordon) – 2:02
"Is It Any Wonder" (Kaylan) – 2:32

Bonus tracks from the Repertoire Records CD re-issue:
"So Goes Love" (from Golden Hits) – 2:36
"Grim Reaper of Love" (Portz, Nichol) (single A-side) – 2:43
"Outside Chance" (Zevon) (single A-side) – 2:08
"We'll Meet Again" (Burnett, Griffin) (single mix B-side) – 2:08
"Can I Get to Know You Better" (Barri, Sloan) (single A-side) – 2:38
"You Know What I Mean" (Bonner, Gordon) – 1:59
"Happy Together" (Bonner, Gordon) (mono single mix) – 2:50
"She'd Rather Be with Me" (Bonner, Gordon) (mono single mix) – 2:17
"You Know What I Mean" (Bonner, Gordon) (mono single mix) – 1:59

Manifesto Records CD re-issue (2016):

This edition reverts to the original tracklisting, presented twice: first in mono, then in stereo.

Personnel 

 Howard Kaylan - vocals, keyboard
 Mark Volman - harmony vocals, guitar, tambourine
 Al Nichol - guitar, vocals
 Jim Tucker - guitar, vocals
 Jim Pons - bass, vocals
 Chip Douglas - bass guitar, vocals on “Happy Together” 
 John Barbata - drums, percussion

Certifications

References

The Turtles albums
1967 albums
Albums produced by Joe Wissert
White Whale Records albums
Repertoire Records albums
Sundazed Records albums
EMI Records albums